Vexillography is the art and practice of designing flags; a person who designs flags is a vexillographer. Vexillography is allied with vexillology, the scholarly study of flags, but is not synonymous with that discipline.

Background of flag design
Flag designs exhibit a number of regularities, arising from a variety of practical concerns, historical circumstances, and cultural prescriptions that have shaped and continue to shape their evolution.

Vexillographers face the necessity for the design to be manufactured (and often mass-produced) into or onto a piece of cloth, which will subsequently be hoisted aloft in the outdoors to represent an organization, individual, idea, or group. In this respect, flag design departs considerably from logo design: logos are predominantly still images suitable for reading off a page, screen, or billboard; while flags are alternately draped and fluttering images - visible from a variety of distances and angles (including the reverse). The prevalence of simple bold colors and shapes in flag design attests to these practical issues.

Flag design has a history, and new designs often refer back to previous designs, effectively quoting, elaborating, or commenting upon them. Families of current flags may derive from a few common ancestors - as in the cases of the Pan-African colours, the Pan-Arab colors, the Pan-Slavic colors, the Nordic Cross flag and the Ottoman flag.

Certain cultures prescribe the proper design of their own flags, through heraldic or other authoritative systems. Prescription may be based on religious principles: see, for example, Islamic flags. Vexillographers have begun to articulate design principles, such as those jointly published by the North American Vexillological Association and the Flag Institute in their Guiding Principles of Flag Design.

Principles of design
In 2006, the North American Vexillological Association published a booklet titled Good Flag, Bad Flag to aid those wishing to design or re-design a flag. Taking a minimalist approach, the booklet lists five basic flag design principles which have become a standard reference in the vexillographer community. In 2014, the North American Vexillological Association, alongside the Flag Institute created an updated booklet titled The Commission's Report on the Guiding Principles of Flag Design, which addresses issues present in Good Flag, Bad Flag, and goes more in-depth on the ideas laid forth in the aforementioned booklet. The guidelines in this booklet can be summarized as follows:

Basics
Keep in mind the physics of a flag in flight when designing a flag
Simple designs are more easily remembered
Flags should have distinctive designs that separate them from others
Designs and trends should be avoided if there is a possibility that they can date quickly

Color
Using fewer colors keeps designs simple and bold
Contrast is important; use light on dark and dark on light
Modern printing techniques have made more shades of color available than previously, and this can be used advantageously 
Designs should make the edge of a flag be well-defined so as to not get visually lost in the background of where it is flying
Gradient on flags make it look too computer generated, and make it difficult to sew/draw. Try to avoid gradients.

Structure
Charges are best placed in the canton, hoist, or center of a design as these are the most visually prominent areas
Flag designs are usually longer than they are tall
Having different designs on the obverse and reverse of a flag undermines recognition and increase cost of production

Devices
A single device used in a prominent position ensures recognizability when the flag is in flight or at rest
When multiple devices are used, different background colors can be used to "anchor" the devices into the overall design
Devices should be stylized graphical representations as opposed to realistic renderings
Writing on flags is difficult to read in flight; Parade Banners and Military Colors are usually more rigid than normal flags, making text more commonplace on them
Charges with directionality traditionally face towards the hoist, or flagpole
Seals, coats of arms, or logos are usually too complex to be used effectively on a flag, although exceptions exist

Symbolism
Symbols should be both distinct and representative
A flag should represent the totality of any given community as opposed to its individual parts
A flag should emphasize its own identity over higher-level groupings, otherwise distinctiveness is lost
Symbolism relating to other entities should only be used if there is a clear, direct relevance
Designers should avoid representing any particular reference in multiple ways, and instead try to make a single definitive reference

Prominent vexillographers
 Columbano Bordalo Pinheiro, designer of the flag of Portugal
 Luis and Sabino Arana, designers of the Ikurriña (the flag of the Basque Country)
 Graham Bartram, designer of the flag of Tristan da Cunha and others
 Manuel Belgrano, designer of the flag of Argentina
 Frederick 'Fred' Brownell, designer of the flags of South Africa and Namibia
 Ron Cobb, designer of the American Ecology Flag
 John Eisenmann, designer of the flag of the U.S. state of Ohio
 Mohamed Hamzah, designer of the flag of Malaya
 Quamrul Hassan, designer of the flag of Bangladesh
 Cederic Herbert, designer of the flag of the short-lived Zimbabwe Rhodesia
 Francis Hopkinson, generally acknowledged designer of the American flag
 Friedensreich Hundertwasser, designer of a koru flag, among others
 Susan K. Huhume, designer of the flag of Papua New Guinea
 Sharif Hussein, designer of the flag of the Arab Revolt
 James I of England, designer of the first flag of Great Britain
 Syed Amir-uddin Kedwaii, designer of the flag of Pakistan
 Lu Haodong, designer of the Blue Sky with a White Sun flag of the Republic of China
 Nicola Marschall, designer of the "Stars and Bars", the First National Flag of the Confederate States of America
 John McConnell, designer of a flag of the Earth
 Fredrik Meltzer, designer of the flag of Norway
 Raimundo Teixeira Mendes, designer of the flag of Brazil
 William Porcher Miles, designer of the battle flag of the Confederate States of America
 Francisco de Miranda, designer of the flag of Venezuela, upon which the present flags of Colombia and Ecuador are based.
 Theodosia Okoh, designer of the flag of Ghana
 Christopher Pratt, designer of the flag of the Canadian province of Newfoundland and Labrador
 Orren Randolph Smith, citizen of North Carolina who is co-credited as being the father of the "Stars and Bars" flag, along with Nicola Marschall.
 Whitney Smith, designer of the flag of Guyana and other flags
 George Stanley, designer of the flag of Canada
 Joaquín Suárez, designer of the flag of Uruguay
 Pingali Venkayya, designer of the flag of India
 Robert Watt, designer of the flag of Vancouver, British Columbia, Canada
 Oliver Wolcott, Jr., designer of the flag of the United States Customs Service
 Zeng Liansong, designer of the flag of the People's Republic of China
 İsmet Güney, designer of the flag of Cyprus
 Nguyen Huu Tien, designer of the flag of Vietnam
 Gilbert Baker, designer of the rainbow flag symbol of the LGBT Movement
 Alexander Baretich, designer of the Cascadian bioregional flag AKA Doug Flag
 Ralph Eugene Diffendorfer, co-designer of the Christian Flag
 Christopher Gadsden, designer of the Gadsden flag
 Monica Helms, designer of the Transgender pride flag
 Catherine Rebecca Murphy Winborne - the "Betsy Ross of the Confederacy" - also co-credited as the designer of the "Stars and Bars" flag
 Adolf Hitler, designer of the flag of Nazi Germany, the Reichskriegsflagge and his personal standard
 Betsy Ross, designer, according to legend, of the American flag during the American Revolution
 Theodore Sizer, designed of the flag of St. Louis
 Gerard Slevin, former Chief Herald of Ireland reputed to have helped design the flag of Europe.
 Emilio Aguinaldo, 1st president of the Republic of the Philippines, along with the designer of the countries' flag.

Notes